Oleg Nikolayevich Kechko (Олег Николаевич Кечко, born  in Minsk) is an International Master of Sport and Belarusian male weightlifter, competing in the 77 kg category and representing Belarus at international competitions. He participated at the 1996 Summer Olympics in the 76 kg event. He competed at world championships, most recently at the 1998 World Weightlifting Championships.

Major results
 - 1993 European Championships Middleweight class (360.0 kg)

References

External links
 

1967 births
Living people
Belarusian male weightlifters
Weightlifters at the 1996 Summer Olympics
Olympic weightlifters of Belarus
Sportspeople from Minsk